Arlington School District No. 16 is a public school district in Snohomish County, Washington and serves the city of Arlington.

As of January 2011, the Arlington School District has about 5,400 students and 530 staff at 10 schools. These include the Historic Trafton Elementary School (see references below), Weston High School (alternative program), Apple pre-school, and Stillaguamish Valley School (home-school support).

Schools

High schools
 Arlington High School
 Weston High School

Middle schools
 Post Middle School
 Haller Middle School

Elementary schools
 Eagle Creek Elementary School
 Kent Prairie Elementary School
 Presidents Elementary School
 Pioneer Elementary School
 Trafton Elementary School
 Stillaguamish Valley School

References

External links
 Arlington School District No. 16 website
 Arlington School District Report Card

School districts in Washington (state)
Education in Snohomish County, Washington
Arlington, Washington